Elizabeth Kelso (28 May 1889 – 7 July 1967) was a New Zealand journalist, editor and community leader. She was born in Fort William, Argyllshire, Scotland on 28 May 1889.

References

1889 births
1967 deaths
People from Fort William, Highland
Scottish emigrants to New Zealand
20th-century New Zealand women writers
20th-century New Zealand writers
20th-century New Zealand journalists